José Mariano Jiménez Wald (January 30, 1843 – August 1, 1901) was a Peruvian lawyer, judge and politician. He graduated from the National University of San Marcos and served on its faculty. He served as foreign minister and minister of the interior in the Government of Peru. He was Prime Minister of Peru (March–April 1889, May 1893 – April 1894).

Bibliography
 Basadre, Jorge: Historia de la República del Perú. 1822 - 1933, Octava Edición, corregida y aumentada. Tomo 8. Editada por el Diario "La República" de Lima y la Universidad "Ricardo Palma". Impreso en Santiago de Chile, 1998.
Godoy, José Francisco: Enciclopedia biográfica de contemporáneos, 1898.
Tauro del Pino, Alberto: Enciclopedia Ilustrada del Perú. Tercera Edición. Tomo 9. JAB/LLO. Lima, PEISA, 2001. 

1843 births
1901 deaths
19th-century Peruvian judges
National University of San Marcos alumni
Academic staff of the National University of San Marcos
Peruvian Ministers of Interior
Foreign ministers of Peru